Madhu Koda (born 6 January 1971) is an Indian politician who had served as the  Chief Minister of Jharkhand from 2006 to 2008 (UPA alliance). He 
was sworn in as the fourth Chief Minister of Jharkhand on 14 September 2006, and remained in office until he resigned on 23 August 2008.

Koda is the third independent legislator to assume the office of chief minister of an Indian state, including Bishwanath Das in Orissa in 1971 and Flinder Anderson Khonglam in Meghalaya in 2002.

His wife Geeta Koda, MP from West Singhbhum district is among the six MLAs representing smaller regional parties led by Hemant Soren formed on 13 July 2013. In December 2017, he was convicted by a court of law and sentenced to three-years in jail and fined .

Personal life

Madhu Koda was born in Vill. Gua, District. West Singhbhum in Jharkhand. An ethnic Ho, his father is Rasika Koda, a tribal farmer, who lives in Vill. Pathhatu in District. Singhbhum. He is a graduate from IGNOU centre, Bhubneshwar. His father wanted Madhu to have a "normal life" and remain a farmer or iron worker, but after experiencing corruption in the iron industry, he eventually began a career in politics.

Koda is married to Geeta Koda, who is an MLA from his previous constituency Jaganathpur from the Jai Bharat Samanta Party. They have two daughters.

Political career
Madhu Koda began his political career as an activist with the All Jharkhand Students Union. He won in the 2000 Bihar Assembly elections from Jaganathpur as a Bharatiya Janata Party (BJP) candidate. On 15 Nov. 2000 the state of Jharkhand was carved out from the southern part of Bihar. Koda's constituency Jaganathpur was included in Jharkhand and he became a member of the Jharkhand Legislative Assembly. Babulal Marandi of BJP became the first CM of Jharkhand on 15 Nov. 2000.

In this government, Madhu became the Minister of State, Rural Engineering Organisation (Ind. Charge). But there was revolt against Marandi by rebels and he finally resigned. Arjun Munda took over and became the CM on 18 Mar. 2003 and in this government Koda became the minister of Panchayati Raj of Special Arrangement.

During the 2005 Assembly Elections in Jharkhand, the BJP denied Koda a ticket. He contested as an Independent candidate and won from Jaganathpur once again, defeating his nearest rival from the Indian National Congress by over ten thousand votes. Koda extended his support to the BJP-led NDA.

On 2 March 2005, after much political bargaining and quid pro quo Shibu Soren of Congress-JMM alliance was invited to form the government in Jharkhand by the Governor of Jharkhand, Syed Sibtey Razi.

He resigned as Chief Minister nine days later, on 11 March, following his failure to obtain a vote of confidence in the assembly. Then Arjun Munda of BJP-led NDA became the CM, whom Koda supported and he was appointed the Minister of Mining Geology and Cooperative.

In September 2006, Madhu and three other independent legislators withdrew support to the Munda government, bringing it into the minority and led to resignation of Munda The United Progressive Alliance decided on him as consensus candidate to become Chief Minister and Koda became the next CM of Jharkhand on 14 Sept., 2006.

His government included the representatives of the Jharkhand Mukti Morcha, Rashtriya Janata Dal, Jaua Manjhi group, Nationalist Congress Party, All India Forward Bloc, three independent MLAs (besides himself), and the outside support of the Indian National Congress. On 12 Aug. 2008 Shibu Soren again staked claim for the post of CM and wanted Koda to resign. On 17 Aug. 2008 JMM withdrew support from the Koda government, and Koda resigned on 23 Aug. 2008 from the post of CM of Jharkhand. Koda became the UPA in charge of Jharkhand state. Shibu Soren again became the CM of Jharkhand on 27 Aug. 2008.

But Soren suffered a humiliating defeat in the assembly bypoll on 8 Jan. 2009 from Tamar constituency and failed to enter the Jharkhand assembly. He was defeated by Gopal Krishna Patar of Jharkhand Party, now a MLA from JD(U) – a constituent of NDA – by a margin of 9,062 votes. Soren subsequently resigned on 12 Jan. 2009 and after this President's rule was imposed in Jharkhand on 19 Jan. 2009 and till 29 Dec. 2009. Koda then won the MP seat from Singhbhum parliamentary constituency again as an independent candidate, the results of which were declared on 16 May 2009.

In the next assembly elections of Jharkhand held 25 Nov. 2009, his wife Geeta Koda won from his constituency Jaganathpur from Jai Bharat Samanta Party, the results of which were declared on 23 Dec. 2009. In 2014 Jharkhand Assembly Election, Madhu Koda lost from the Majhgao constituency. Koda was defeated by Jharkhand Mukti Morcha (JMM) candidate Nial Purty by over 20,000 votes.

Mining scam conviction 
It was alleged that Madhu Koda was involved in a mining scam that occurred in Jharkhand in India. It was alleged by investigative agencies that Madhu Koda took huge bribes for illegally allotting iron ore and coal mining contracts in Jharkhand when he was the chief minister of the state. On orders of Jharkhand High Court CBI is investigating the scam.

Koda was arrested by state police's vigilance wing on 30 November 2009 in connection with the mining scam. On 31 July 2013, he was released on bail from Birsa Munda Prison in Ranchi.

A Special money-laundering court in Delhi attached Koda's properties worth  in a disproportionate assets case against his alleged associates. It found that the properties were involved in the offence of laundering under the provisions of The Prevention Of Money Laundering Act (PMLA) in a case probed by Enforcement Directorate (ED). Some of the attached assets also belonged to Anil Adinath Bastawde, who was arrested by the ED in January 2013 from Jakarta and Manoj B Punamiya, an associate of Koda and an accused in the case.

References

1971 births
Living people
Chief Ministers of Jharkhand
India MPs 2009–2014
People from West Singhbhum district
Indian prisoners and detainees
Lok Sabha members from Jharkhand
Indian National Congress politicians
Bharatiya Janata Party politicians from Jharkhand
Independent politicians in India
Coal block allocation scam
Corruption in Jharkhand
All Jharkhand Students Union politicians
Adivasi politicians
Jharkhand MLAs 2000–2005
Jharkhand MLAs 2005–2009
Indian politicians convicted of corruption
People convicted of corruption